Zhytomyr National Agroecological University is the only agrarian higher educational institution with an ecological profile in Ukraine and the only university with national status in Zhytomyr Oblast. The University provides specialists in the majority of national economic sectors in the Ukrainian Polesia (Zhytomyr, Rivne and Volyn oblasts). The university has some seven thousand students and is divided into eight faculties (agronomy, technology of animal production and processing, veterinary medicine, agricultural engineering and energetics, ecology and law, forestry, accounting and finance, economics and management) and 42 departments.

International profile
Zhytomyr National Agroecological University became on July 6, 2017 the first among the national agricultural universities and the second highest educational institution in Ukraine to join the EUROSCI Network, a network of international academic players that brings together universities, research centers, departments, and expert groups, with a common interest in the study of the European Union and European integration from a scientific perspective.

An important direction of international activity is to provide students with the opportunity to study the latest agricultural technologies and the organization of business activities in the field of agricultural development in the agricultural economies of the United Kingdom, Germany, France, Denmark, the Netherlands, Poland, the United States.

References

 
Universities and colleges in Zhytomyr
National universities in Ukraine